Acracona remipedalis is a species of snout moth in the genus Acracona. It was described by Ferdinand Karsch in 1900 and is known from Togo, Sierra Leone and Nigeria.

References

Moths described in 1900
Tirathabini
Moths of Africa